Amanda Lee may refer to:

 Amanda Lee (actress) (born 1970), Hong Kong singer and actress
 Amanda Lee (ER), a fictional character in the medical drama ER
 Amanda Lee, pseudonym used by Eileen Buckholtz and Ruth Glick
 Amanda Winn-Lee, an American voice actress
 AmaLee (born 1992) known by her YouTube name "LeeandLie", an American singer, YouTube personality and voice actress

See also
Amanda Leigh, an album by American artist Mandy Moore
 Amanda Winn-Lee (born 1972), American voice actress, writer and ADR director
Mandy Lee (disambiguation)